Calcite is a carbonate mineral and the most stable polymorph of calcium carbonate (CaCO3). It is a very common mineral, particularly as a component of limestone. Calcite defines hardness 3 on the Mohs scale of mineral hardness, based on scratch hardness comparison. Large calcite crystals are used in optical equipment, and limestone composed mostly of calcite has numerous uses.

Other polymorphs of calcium carbonate are the minerals aragonite and vaterite. Aragonite will change to calcite over timescales of days or less at temperatures exceeding 300 °C, and vaterite is even less stable.

Etymology
Calcite is derived from the German Calcit, a term from the 19th century that came from the Latin word for lime, calx (genitive calcis) with the suffix "-ite" used to name minerals. It is thus etymologically related to chalk.
 
When applied by archaeologists and stone trade professionals, the term alabaster is used not just as in geology and mineralogy, where it is reserved for a variety of gypsum; but also for a similar-looking, translucent variety of fine-grained banded deposit of calcite.

Unit cell and Miller indices
In publications, two different sets of Miller indices are used to describe directions in hexagonal and rhombohedral crystals, including calcite crystals: three Miller indices  in the  directions, or four Bravais-Miller indices  in the  directions, where  is redundant but useful in visualizing permutation symmetries.

To add to the complications, there are also two definitions of unit cell for calcite. One, an older "morphological" unit cell, was inferred by measuring angles between faces of crystals, typically with a goniometer, and looking for the smallest numbers that fit. Later, a "structural" unit cell was determined using X-ray crystallography. For the same orientation,  must be multiplied by 4 to convert from morphological to structural units. As an example, calcite cleavage is given as "perfect on {1 0  1}" in morphological coordinates and "perfect on {1 0  4}" in structural units. In  indices, these are {1 0 1} and {1 0 4}, respectively. Twinning, cleavage and crystal forms are often given in morphological units.

Properties 
The diagnostic properties of calcite include a defining Mohs hardness of 3, a specific gravity of 2.71 and, in crystalline varieties, a vitreous luster. Color is white or none, though shades of gray, red, orange, yellow, green, blue, violet, brown, or even black can occur when the mineral is charged with impurities.

Crystal habits
Calcite has numerous habits, representing combinations of over 1000 crystallographic forms.  Most common are scalenohedra, with faces in the hexagonal {2 1 1} directions (morphological unit cell) or {2 1 4} directions (structural unit cell); and rhombohedral, with faces in the {1 0 1} or {1 0 4} directions (the most common cleavage plane). Habits include acute to obtuse rhombohedra, tabular habits, prisms, or various scalenohedra. Calcite exhibits several twinning types that add to the observed habits. It may occur as fibrous, granular, lamellar, or compact. A fibrous, efflorescent habit is known as lublinite. Cleavage is usually in three directions parallel to the rhombohedron form. Its fracture is conchoidal, but difficult to obtain.

Scalenohedral faces are chiral and come in pairs with mirror-image symmetry; their growth can be influenced by interaction with chiral biomolecules such as L- and D-amino acids. Rhombohedral faces are not chiral.

Optical

Calcite is transparent to opaque and may occasionally show phosphorescence or fluorescence. A transparent variety called "Iceland spar" is used for optical purposes. Acute scalenohedral crystals are sometimes referred to as "dogtooth spar" while the rhombohedral form is sometimes referred to as "nailhead spar". The rhombohedral form may also have been the "sunstone" whose use by Viking navigators is mentioned in the Icelandic Sagas.

Single calcite crystals display an optical property called birefringence (double refraction). This strong birefringence causes objects viewed through a clear piece of calcite to appear doubled. The birefringent effect (using calcite) was first described by the Danish scientist Rasmus Bartholin in 1669. At a wavelength of about 590 nm, calcite has ordinary and extraordinary refractive indices of 1.658 and 1.486, respectively. Between 190 and 1700 nm, the ordinary refractive index varies roughly between 1.9 and 1.5, while the extraordinary refractive index varies between 1.6 and 1.4.

Thermoluminescence

Calcite has thermoluminescent properties mainly due to manganese divalent. An experiment was conducted by adding activators such as ions of Mn, Fe, Co, Ni, Cu, Zn, Ag, Pb, and Bi to the calcite samples to observe if they emitted heat or light. The results showed that adding ions did not react. However, a reaction occurred when both manganese and lead ions were present in calcite.

Mineral thermoluminescence can form various glow curves of crystals under different conditions, such as temperature changes, because impurity ions or other crystal defects present in minerals supply luminescence centers and trapping levels. Observing these curve changes also can help infer geological correlation and age determination.

Chemical
Calcite, like most carbonates, dissolves in acids by the follow reaction

The carbon dioxide released by this reaction produces a characteristic effervescence when a calcite sample is treated with an acid.

Due to its acidity, carbon dioxide has a slight solubilizing effect on calcite. The overall reaction is

If the amount of dissolved carbon dioxide drops, the reaction reverses to precipitate calcite. As a result, calcite can be either dissolved by groundwater or precipitated by groundwater, depending on such factors as the water temperature, pH, and dissolved ion concentrations. When conditions are right for precipitation, calcite forms mineral coatings that cement rock grains together and can fill fractures.  When conditions are right for dissolution, the removal of calcite can dramatically increase the porosity and permeability of the rock, and if it continues for a long period of time, may result in the formation of caves. Continued dissolution of calcium carbonate-rich formations can lead to the expansion and eventual collapse of cave systems, resulting in various forms of karst topography.

Calcite exhibits an unusual characteristic called retrograde solubility: it is less soluble in water as the temperature increases. Calcite is also more soluble at higher pressures.

Pure calcite has the composition . However, the calcite in limestone often contains a few percent of magnesium. Calcite in limestone is divided into low-magnesium and high-magnesium calcite, with the dividing line placed at a composition of 4% magnesium. High-magnesium calcite retains the calcite mineral structure, which is distinct from that of dolomite, . Calcite can also contain small quantities of iron and manganese. Manganese may be responsible for the fluorescence of impure calcite, as may traces of organic compounds.

Distribution
Calcite is found all over the world, and its leading global distribution is as follows:

The United States

Calcite is found in many different areas in the United States. One of the best examples is the Calcite Quarry in Michigan. The Calcite Quarry is the largest carbonate mine in the world and has been in use for more than 85 years. Large quantities of calcite can be mined from these sizeable open pit mines.

Canada

Calcite can also be found throughout Canada, such as in Thorold Quarry and Madawaska Mine, Ontario, Canada.

Mexico

Abundant calcite is mined in the Santa Eulalia mining district, Chihuahua, Mexico.

Iceland

Large quantities of calcite in Iceland are concentrated in the Helgustadir mine. The mine was once the primary mining location of "Iceland spar."  However, it currently serves as a nature reserve, and calcite mining will not be allowed.

England

Calcite is found in parts of England, such as Alston Moor, Egremont, and Frizington, Cumbria.

Germany

St. Andreasberg, Harz Mountains, and Freiberg, Saxony can find calcite.

Use and applications

Ancient Egyptians carved many items out of calcite, relating it to their goddess Bast, whose name contributed to the term alabaster because of the close association. Many other cultures have used the material for similar carved objects and applications.

A transparent variety of calcite known as Iceland spar may have been used by Vikings for navigating on cloudy days.

In World War II, high-grade optical calcite was used for gun sights, specifically in bomb sights and anti-aircraft weaponry. It was used as a polarizer (in Nicol prisms) before the invention of Polaroid plates and still finds use in optical instruments. Also, experiments have been conducted to use calcite for a cloak of invisibility.

Microbiologically precipitated calcite has a wide range of applications, such as soil remediation, soil stabilization and concrete repair. It also can be used for tailings management and is designed to promote sustainable development in the mining industry.

Calcite can help synthesize precipitated calcium carbonate (PCC) (mainly used in the paper industry) and increase carbonation. Furthermore, due to its particular crystal habit, such as rhombohedron, hexagonal prism, etc., it promotes the production of PCC with specific shapes and particle sizes.

Calcite, obtained from an 80 kg sample of Carrara marble, is used as the IAEA-603 isotopic standard in mass spectrometry for the calibration of δ18O and δ13C.

Calcite can be formed naturally or synthesized. However, artificial calcite is the preferred material to be used as a scaffold in bone tissue engineering due to its controllable and repeatable properties.

Natural occurrence
Calcite is a common constituent of sedimentary rocks, limestone in particular, much of which is formed from the shells of dead marine organisms.  Approximately 10% of sedimentary rock is limestone. It is the primary mineral in metamorphic marble. It also occurs in deposits from hot springs as a vein mineral; in caverns as stalactites and stalagmites; and in volcanic or mantle-derived rocks such as carbonatites, kimberlites, or rarely in peridotites.

Calcite is often the primary constituent of the shells of marine organisms, such as plankton (such as coccoliths and planktic foraminifera), the hard parts of red algae, some sponges, brachiopods, echinoderms, some serpulids, most bryozoa, and parts of the shells of some bivalves (such as oysters and rudists). Calcite is found in spectacular form in the Snowy River Cave of New Mexico as mentioned above, where microorganisms are credited with natural formations. Trilobites, which became extinct a quarter billion years ago, had unique compound eyes that used clear calcite crystals to form the lenses. It also forms a substantial part of birds' eggshells, and the δC of the diet is reflected in the δC of the calcite of the shell.

Classic samples have been produced at Madawaska Mine, near Bancroft, Ontario.

Bedding parallel veins of fibrous calcite, often referred to in quarrying parlance as beef, occur in dark organic rich mudstones and shales, these veins are formed by increasing fluid pressure during diagenesis.

Formation processes 
Calcite formation can proceed by several pathways, from the classical terrace ledge kink model to the crystallization of poorly ordered precursor phases like amorphous calcium carbonate (ACC) via an Ostwald ripening process, or via the agglomeration of nanocrystals.

The crystallization of ACC can occur in two stages. First, the ACC nanoparticles rapidly dehydrate and crystallize to form individual particles of vaterite. Second, the vaterite transforms to calcite via a dissolution and reprecipitation mechanism, with the reaction rate controlled by the surface area of a calcite crystal. The second stage of the reaction is approximately 10 times slower.

However, crystallization of calcite has been observed to be dependent on the starting pH and concentration of magnesium in solution. A neutral starting pH during mixing promotes the direct transformation of ACC into calcite without a vaterite intermediate. But when ACC forms in a solution with a basic initial pH, the transformation to calcite occurs via metastable vaterite, following the pathway outlined above. Magnesium has a noteworthy effect on both the stability of ACC and its transformation to crystalline CaCO3, resulting in the formation of calcite directly from ACC, as this ion destabilizes the structure of vaterite.

Calcite may form in the subsurface in response to microorganism activity, such as sulfate-dependent anaerobic oxidation of methane, where methane is oxidized and sulfate is reduced, leading to precipitation of calcite and pyrite from the produced bicarbonate and sulfide. These processes can be traced by the specific carbon isotope composition of the calcites, which are extremely depleted in the 13C isotope, by as much as −125 per mil PDB (δ13C).

In Earth history
Calcite seas existed in Earth's history when the primary inorganic precipitate of calcium carbonate in marine waters was low-magnesium calcite (lmc), as opposed to the aragonite and high-magnesium calcite (hmc) precipitated today.  Calcite seas alternated with aragonite seas over the Phanerozoic, being most prominent in the Ordovician and Jurassic periods.  Lineages evolved to use whichever morph of calcium carbonate was favourable in the ocean at the time they became mineralised, and retained this mineralogy for the remainder of their evolutionary history. Petrographic evidence for these calcite sea conditions consists of calcitic ooids, lmc cements, hardgrounds, and rapid early seafloor aragonite dissolution. The evolution of marine organisms with calcium carbonate shells may have been affected by the calcite and aragonite sea cycle.

Calcite is one of the minerals that has been shown to catalyze an important biological reaction, the formose reaction, and may have had a role in the origin of life. Interaction of its chiral surfaces (see Form) with aspartic acid molecules results in a slight bias in chirality; this is one possible mechanism for the origin of homochirality in living cells.

Climate change

Climate change is exacerbating ocean acidification, which may lead to lower natural calcite production. The total amount of artificial  absorbed by the oceans is calculated to be 118 ± 19 Gt C. If a large amount of  dissolves in the sea, it will cause the acidity of the seawater to increase, thereby affecting the pH value of the ocean. Calcifying organisms in the sea, such as molluscs foraminifera, crustaceans, echinoderms and corals, are susceptible to pH changes. Meanwhile, these calcifying organisms are also an essential source of calcite. As ocean acidification causes pH to drop, carbonate ion concentrations will decline, potentially reducing natural calcite production.

Gallery

See also

Ikaite, CaCO3·6H2O
List of minerals
Lysocline
Manganoan calcite, (Ca,Mn)CO3
Monohydrocalcite, CaCO3·H2O
Ocean acidification
Ulexite

References

Further reading

Calcium minerals
Carbonate minerals
Limestone
Optical materials
Transparent materials
Calcite group
Cave minerals
Trigonal minerals
Minerals in space group 167
Evaporite
Luminescent minerals
Polymorphism (materials science)
Bastet